Governor Izard may refer to:

George Izard (1776–1828), 2nd Governor of Arkansas Territory
Mark W. Izard (1799–1866), 2nd Governor of Nebraska Territory